Paola Massidda (born 29 August 1965) is an Italian politician and lawyer.

She joined the Five Star Movement party and became the movement's official candidate for the position of mayor of Carbonia in 2016. She was elected Mayor of Carbonia at the 2016 Italian local elections and took office on 20 June 2016.

Biography
Paola Massidda was born in Carbonia, Italy in 1965. She graduated in law at University of Cagliari in 1991. She decided not to run for re-election in the 2021 elections.

References 

Living people
1965 births
Five Star Movement politicians
Mayors of Carbonia
21st-century Italian women politicians
20th-century Italian women politicians
20th-century Italian lawyers
University of Cagliari alumni
Sardinian women